Jared Drake Bell (born June 27, 1986) is an American actor and musician. Born in Newport Beach, California, he began his career as an actor in the early 1990s at the age of five with his first televised appearance on Home Improvement, and also appeared in several commercials as a child. Bell is best known for his starring roles on Nickelodeon's The Amanda Show and Drake & Josh. He also starred in a trilogy of The Fairly OddParents movies on Nickelodeon. Bell was the voice of Peter Parker / Spider-Man in the animated series Ultimate Spider-Man on Disney XD.

In addition to acting, Bell has a career in music starting in the early 2000s, at the time of his appearances on The Amanda Show, with a band named Drake 24/7. He also co-wrote and performed the theme song to Drake & Josh, entitled "Found a Way". In 2005, he independently released his debut album, Telegraph, released under Bell's own name. His second album, It's Only Time, was released in 2006 after signing with Universal Motown Records and debuted at No. 81 on the Billboard 200, selling over 23,000 copies during its first week of release. It's Only Time has sold 178,000 copies in the United States as of 2012. His first video album, Drake Bell in Concert, was released in 2008. It debuted at No. 81 on the Top 100 Mexican Albums Chart. Bell released an EP in 2011 called A Reminder independently. In 2014, Bell released his third album, Ready Steady Go! under indie label Surfdog Records. Ready Steady Go! debuted at No. 182 on the Billboard 200, and sold 2,000 copies in its first week of release. Bell was convicted of attempted child endangerment in 2021.

Early life
Bell was born on June 27, 1986, in Newport Beach, California, the son of Robin Dodson and Robert Bell. His parents divorced when he was five years old. While growing up in Orange County, Bell skateboarded and regularly attended punk rock concerts, the music of which he cites as an influence.  He received a GED.

Career

1991–2003: Films, Initial Guitar Lessons, and The Amanda Show
Bell started acting at the age of five, encouraged by his father who attempted to put him into Little League Baseball and other sports with no success before finding Bell's talent in public speaking and his confidence when impersonating people he'd watch on television. He stated "I was five, and my dad kind of said, 'Hey, you wanna be an actor?' and I said, 'Sure,' that kind of thing, you know? I was kind of put into it by my dad but, you know, good. I really love it, and I still do it." Bell's first televised commercial was for Whirlpool Appliances. "I had to sit under a tree and eat a Popsicle," Bell later stated, "I thought, 'I could get used to this.'" His first television show appearance was on a 1994 episode of Home Improvement. He appeared in the 1996 film Jerry Maguire, and had a small role in the Seinfeld episode "The Frogger" in 1998. In 1999, he acted in a commercial for Pokémon Red and Blue and in the movie Dragon World: The Legend Continues. In 2000, he was nominated for a Young Artist Award for his role as Cage Redding in the made-for-television film The Jack Bull. He began to play guitar at the age of twelve. He received his first official guitar lessons from Roger Daltrey when he starred with him in the 2001 film Chasing Destiny. From 1999 until the show was cancelled in 2002, Bell was a featured performer on The Amanda Show. He also made a guest appearance on the series The Nightmare Room.

2003–09: Drake & Josh, Telegraph, and It's Only Time

In 2003, Bell was cast as Drake Parker alongside Amanda Show costar Josh Peck on the Nickelodeon series Drake & Josh. His song, "Found a Way", was featured as the theme song and is therefore included on the show's soundtrack, released on February 22, 2005. During this time period, he appeared as himself on Nickelodeon's Zoey 101 in the episode "Spring Fling", where he performed "Highway to Nowhere", which is also featured on the Drake & Josh soundtrack. He also had his first of three consecutive wins at the Nickelodeon Kids' Choice Awards for "Favorite TV Actor". In 2005, Bell co-starred alongside Drake & Josh co-star Miranda Cosgrove with Dennis Quaid in Yours, Mine and Ours.

Telegraph, Bell's debut album, was released independently on August 23, 2005. The album includes 12 tracks. All the tracks were written only by Bell with the exception of "Highway to Nowhere". Being an independent release, the album ran out of print, and was re-released on August 7, 2007. "Down We Fall" was played on an episode of Drake & Josh titled "Number 1 Fan". In 2005, Bell performed with Hawk Nelson in a video for the Hawk Nelson song called "Bring 'Em Out", which was featured in the movie Yours, Mine and Ours. The studio version was included on Hawk Nelson's EP Bring 'Em Out and on the special edition of Hawk Nelson Is My Friend.

In 2006, Bell signed with Universal Motown. Bell's second album, It's Only Time, was released on December 5, 2006. Bell wrote all of the songs, however, they were all co-written with either C.J. Abraham, Michael Corcoran, or both. It reached Number 81 on Billboard's Top 200. It also charted on the Billboard Rock Charts at number 21. The album was more successful in Mexico, reaching number 4 in the Mexico Top 100. It is his first album to chart on the Billboard 200, and his highest-selling album with more than 178,000 copies sold in the United States as of 2012. He released the lead single, "I Know", on October 17, 2006. The video for "I Know" was released in October 2006. The single topped the Mexican music charts. "I Know" also appeared on the 2010 compilation album Pure Love Songs Vol. 2. His song from It's Only Time, "Makes Me Happy", peaked at number 3 on the Bubbling Under Hot 100 Singles Chart, which is an extension of the Hot 100. The song was featured in the Drake & Josh series finale "Really Big Shrimp". The song also made an appearance on the Pop 100 at number 67 and on the Hot Digital Songs chart at number 45. Because of the song's popularity, on October 16, 2007, the Radio Disney single edit version of his song "Makes Me Happy" was released on iTunes.

He also featured on the theme song for the show iCarly, "Leave It All to Me", with his Drake & Josh co-star Miranda Cosgrove. The music video for the song was released on Cosgrove's Vevo YouTube channel on September 28, 2010. The song took the lowest position on the Hot 100, peaking at number 100. It also peaked on the Pop 100 at number 83. He performed some Christmas songs in the Merry Christmas, Drake & Josh movie, including "Jingle Bells" and "Christmas Promise". A DVD entitled Drake Bell in Concert was released on December 16, 2008. The video was unable to crack the 2008 or 2009 Top 100 in the U.S., but did chart on the Top 100 Mexican album charts, peaking at number 81. The DVD contains footage of him and his band live on stage while they toured in Mexico, filmed during five sold out fall nights. It also features 2 new songs and five covers, all of which are exclusive to the DVD. In the spring, Bell had a starring role in the comedy spoof film Superhero Movie. Bell recorded a theme song featuring his co-star Sara Paxton for the film called "Superhero! Song", which was released on April 8, 2008. In August 2008, he co-starred in the comedy College, which was shot on location in New Orleans. Bell also starred in Merry Christmas, Drake & Josh alongside Josh Peck, which began production in July 2008, and premiered on December 5, 2008. In 2009, his songs "Unbelievable" and "Modern Times", which were featured on a commercial for Twalkin, were released exclusively on Myspace. Bell was also cast in a pilot for a then upcoming CBS comedy series, Fish Tank, stating Bell's involvement is what put the series into production in the first place. The series however, was never picked up. Bell also had a third album, set to be released in 2009; however, the album was apparently shelved and never released, until it was released in 2020 as "The Lost Album".

2010–present: Films, A Reminder, Ready Steady Go!, and Honest
In 2010, he made a cameo appearance as Drake Parker in an iCarly episode entitled "iBloop" and a guest role in I Owe My Life To Corbin Bleu. He starred as Timmy Turner in the live-action TV-movie adaptation of its hit animated series The Fairly Odd Parents, A Fairly Odd Movie: Grow Up, Timmy Turner!, released in 2011 and reprised his role in the 2012 sequel A Fairly Odd Christmas. On May 18, 2011, a music video for Bell's song "You're Not Thinking" was released on YouTube. Bell's EP, titled A Reminder, was released on June 28, 2011. The lead single of A Reminder, "Terrific", was released on June 14, 2011, with the music video being released on December 9, 2012. The EP was produced by John Fields, who previously worked with Rooney, Jimmy Eat World, Selena Gomez, the Jonas Brothers, and Bleu. Bell said he decided to release A Reminder because he hasn't put out new music in a few years and "a full album will probably not happen until next year." Bell was also sued by Fields, the producer of the EP, for 9 songs at 9,000 dollars each, totaling up to 81,000. Bell only paid for 5 songs for 45,000, but only 4 songs made it to the EP.

In February 2012, Bell appeared in a Shane Dawson YouTube video entitled Kidnapping Drake Bell. Bell was cast as Spider-Man in the animated TV series Ultimate Spider-Man based on the comic book of the same name. He later reprised the role in The Avengers: Earth's Mightiest Heroes, replacing Josh Keaton who originally recorded his role for the series. He has also voiced the role of Spider-Man in two video games, Marvel Heroes, an MMORPG, and Disney Infinity: Marvel Super Heroes, in 2013 and 2014, respectively. He was also in the 2012 Nickelodeon movie Rags as Shawn. In 2013, Bell participated in an episode of the ABC reality TV series Splash, a celebrity diving competition, in which he made third place. On November 1, 2013, Bell released the studio version of his unreleased song "Nevermind" on YouTube. He released a holiday single, "Christmas Promise", on December 17, 2013. Throughout 2013 and 2014, Bell had roles in several animated films, such as The Naughty List, Adventure Planet, Birds of Paradise and Under Wraps. Bell returned as Timmy Turner in the third The Fairly OddParents live-action film, A Fairly Odd Summer, which was released on August 2, 2014. In 2014, Bell was nominated in the Capital Twitter Awards for Biggest Twitter Feud vs. Justin Bieber. Bell also appeared on Takepart Live to discuss his bankruptcy and other activities. Bell starred in an animated film entitled Frozen in Time, which was released November 11, 2014.

Bell had his third studio album set to be released in early 2013. Then, he stated it as "a complete concept record. Getting in a time machine and going back to the 40s and 50s." On April 22, 2014, Bell released his third studio album, his first rockabilly album, Ready Steady Go!, under Surfdog Records, with which he signed in 2012. It was produced by Peter Collins and childhood idol Brian Setzer, frontman of the rockabilly revival band Stray Cats. He has referred to the album as  "getting in the DeLorian, hitting 88 miles per hour, and going back to the future." The album's lead single, "Bitchcraft", was released on January 28, 2014. The single was remixed by French electro swing band Caravan Palace. The album's promotional single, "I Won't Stand In Your Way", a cover of the Stray Cats' original song, was released on April 17, 2014. A cover of Cask Mouse's song "Bull", was released as the album's second single on October 8, 2014. The single was listed in the Mexican radio Top 10 for a number of weeks. The album was recorded completely live. It debuted and peaked at number 182 on the Billboard 200 and sold 2,000 copies in its first week of release. Bell took part in the High School Nation Tour in support of Ready Steady Go!, touring High Schools all around the U.S. The tour lasted from September 16 to October 22, 2014. It began in Los Angeles, California and ended in Charlotte, North Carolina. Bell also performed at Exa FM's Concerto Exa 2014 in Mexico City, performing to more than 50,000 people.

He starred with his Drake & Josh co-star Miranda Cosgrove in the animated film A Mouse Tale, which was released directly to DVD on February 10, 2015. Bell starred in the slasher film L.A. Slasher as The Popstar, which was released on June 26, 2015, in a limited theater release. Bell recorded a song for the film's soundtrack, titled "Day & Night". He also stars alongside Bella Thorne and Cameron Dallas in the United States dub of The Frog Kingdom, which was released on June 30, 2015, on video on demand and DVD. He appeared in a documentary about the genre of rockabilly and its culture titled It's a Rockabilly World! Bell later reprised his role as Spider-Man in the 2015 game Disney Infinity 3.0. He also guest starred in an episode with his Drake & Josh co-star Josh Peck on Peck's Fox television series Grandfathered; Bell guest stars as Kirk, a wealthy tech investor. The episode with Bell aired in the Spring of 2016. Bell is set to star as Dan Orange, lead singer of a band called "Orange and the Dead Ends" in a new digital series called Dan is Dead. The premiere date has not yet been set. Bell has recorded a song titled "We're Dead" for the series.

Bell embarked on a concert tour in Mexico starting on February 5, 2016, which ended on February 7, 2016. The tickets were sold out within minutes of going on sale online. Though Bell started the tour in 2015, the Ready Steady Go! Tour will continue in 2016. Bell toured high schools in the US as part of the High School Nation Tour from March 28 to April 29, 2016. Bell stars in the 2017 film Bad Kids of Crestview Academy, a sequel to the 2012 film Bad Kids Go to Hell. Bell released an EP titled Honest on June 30, 2017.

Philanthropy
Since 2009, Bell has supported the Thirst Project, a non-profit organization that addresses the issue of the clean water crisis by raising awareness through education. Bell's contributions include public appeals and concerts to raise funds. Seth Maxwell, founder of the Thirst Project, recruited Bell to be the 'face' of the campaign. Bell has also made contributions to other organizations such as Toys for Tots. On April 18, 2015, Bell performed at the Strawberry Bowl in support of the charity Rockin A Cure for cystic fibrosis.

Influences
Bell has described his music as being heavily influenced by the Beatles, The Beach Boys, and Brian Setzer. Among other music acts and artists that have influenced Bell are Oasis, Buddy Holly, Elvis Costello, The Rolling Stones, Led Zeppelin, Jimmy Page, Eddie Cochran, Elvis Presley, and Chuck Berry.

Personal life
On December 29, 2005, Bell, then 19 years old, and a friend of his were driving from Malibu to Los Angeles when, while stopped at a red light on California State Route 1, the two were struck by an oncoming vehicle. Though Bell's passenger suffered only bruises, Bell's injuries, while not life-threatening, were severe, including a fractured neck and vertebra, a broken jaw, the loss of seven teeth, and deep lacerations to his face. As part of his recovery, Bell required more than 70 facial stitches, had to have his jaw wired shut for two months, and underwent surgery on his chin and mouth.

In 2007, Bell purchased a 2,640-square-foot (245 m2) house in Los Feliz for $2,050,000. After Bell filed for bankruptcy in California in early 2014, the house was taken in foreclosure.

Bell is a cousin of former San Diego Padres relief pitcher Heath Bell.

In August 2020, his former girlfriend Melissa Lingafelt accused him of verbal and physical abuse during their three-year relationship in the late 2000s. Bell has denied the allegations.

In July 2021, Bell revealed that he had been married to Janet Von Schmeling since 2018 after dating for five years and they had a son, Jeremy Drake Bell. In December 2022, it was reported that the couple had separated after 4 years of marriage due to an incident where Bell was reportedly inhaling from balloons in the car with his son inside, despite being on probation for child endangerment charges.

Legal issues

Driving under the influence
Bell was arrested on December 21, 2015, for driving under the influence in Glendale, California at 2:45 AM after police officers witnessed him swerving and driving well over the speed limit. He was subsequently released on $20,000 bond and pleaded not guilty. In September 2016, Bell pleaded guilty and was sentenced to four days in jail and four years' probation and would be required to attend an alcohol education program; Bell served only one day for good behavior. Bell was previously charged with driving under the influence in 2010 in relation to an incident in San Diego in 2009.

Sexual assault accusation and attempted endangering of children
On June 4, 2021, Bell was arrested in Cleveland, Ohio, on charges relating to "attempted endangering [of] children and disseminating matter harmful to juveniles." A public information officer with the Cuyahoga County Prosecutor's Office, said "the 15-year-old victim, who had established a relationship with Bell several years prior, attended his concert in December 2017 [...] While there, Bell violated his duty of care and, in doing so, created a risk of harm to the victim." The Cleveland Police also found that Bell had sent the minor "inappropriate social media messages" for "months leading up to the concert." Bell was 31 at the time of the alleged incident. Bell pleaded not guilty, and was freed on a $2,500 personal bond, and was ordered to provide a DNA sample. He agreed to have no contact with the accuser in the case with a pretrial hearing scheduled for June 23. 

On June 23, Bell pleaded guilty to both charges. On July 12, 2021, Bell's accuser, then 19, made a public appearance and statement accusing him of sexually assaulting her while she was underage, in addition to the endangerment charges. Bell was sentenced to two years of probation and 200 hours of community service, which he was permitted to complete in California. He also is not allowed to have any contact with his victim.  

Several months later, Bell posted his own account of the incident on TikTok, claiming that he had no prior knowledge of the girl's true age during their conversations, for the most part, ending all ties with her upon learning the truth. He went on to say that the girl had henceforth stalked him from one concert to another, which led to his arrest.

Filmography

Film

Television

Video games

Web

Discography

 Telegraph (2005)
 It's Only Time (2006)
 Ready Steady Go!  (2014)
 The Lost Album (2020)
 Sesiones en Casa (2020)
 Non-Stop Flight (2023)

Awards and nominations

Bell was nominated for a Young Artist Award twice, once in 2000 for his role in The Jack Bull, in which he won, and another time in 2006 for Yours, Mine and Ours. He has won 10 Kids Choice Awards, 3 in the United States and 5 internationally for his role as Drake Parker on Drake & Josh. He also won a Kids Choice Award in 2007 in the United Kingdom for Best Male Singer, winning over Justin Timberlake. He was also nominated for Best TV Actor, but lost to Nat Wolff. Bell has also won a Teen Choice Award in 2008 for his role as the Dragonfly in Superhero Movie. He was also nominated for an award in 2014 in the Capital Twitter Awards for biggest Twitter feud with Justin Bieber.

References

External links

 
 
 
 

 
1986 births
Living people
20th-century American male actors
21st-century American comedians
21st-century American composers
21st-century American criminals
21st-century American male actors
21st-century American male musicians
21st-century American singers
American child singers
American male child actors
American male comedians
American male criminals
American male film actors
American male guitarists
American male pianists
American male pop singers
American male singer-songwriters
American male television actors
American male video game actors
American male voice actors
American pop pianists
American pop rock singers
American rock guitarists
American rockabilly guitarists
American rockabilly musicians
American television directors
Child abuse in the United States
Child pop musicians
Comedians from California
Guitarists from California
Male actors from California
Male actors from Newport Beach, California
Male actors from Orange County, California
Motown artists
Musicians from Newport Beach, California
Orange County School of the Arts alumni
People from Newport Beach, California
Power pop musicians
Record producers from California
Singer-songwriters from California
The Challenge (TV series) contestants
Universal Motown Records artists